Louisiana's 39th State Senate district is one of 39 districts in the Louisiana State Senate. It has been represented by Democrat Gregory Tarver since 2012, following his defeat of incumbent fellow Democrat Lydia P. Jackson.

Geography
District 39 covers the northern two-thirds of Caddo Parish in Ark-La-Tex, including most of Shreveport and all of Blanchard and Vivian.

The district is located entirely within Louisiana's 4th congressional district, and overlaps with the 1st, 2nd, 3rd, 4th, and 5th districts of the Louisiana House of Representatives.

Recent election results
Louisiana uses a jungle primary system. If no candidate receives 50% in the first round of voting, when all candidates appear on the same ballot regardless of party, the top-two finishers advance to a runoff election.

2019

2015

2011

Federal and statewide results in District 39

References

Louisiana State Senate districts
Caddo Parish, Louisiana